Norman Squire Brooker (28 September 1889 – 11 December 1976) was an Australian rules footballer who played with Richmond in the Victorian Football League (VFL). 

Brooker was recruited from Warragul in the Central Gippsland Football Association in 1911 and made his debut in August in Round 16, of his short three consecutive game career at Richmond.

Brooker is number 87 on the list of players to have played for the club. 

He went to both World Wars..

Notes

External links 
		

Norm Brooker’s Profile @ Tigerland Archive

1889 births
1976 deaths
Australian rules footballers from Victoria (Australia)
Richmond Football Club players
People from Warragul